The Accused Uncle Shangang is a 1994 Chinese film about life in rural China. It won three of the 1995 Golden Rooster Awards, for best film, best directorial debut (Fan Yuan) and best actor (Li Rentang). It also won best film and best actor at the 1995 Hundred Flowers Awards. It is Fan Yuan's only film to date.

Plot summary

Village Chief Shangang is not a bad man, but he often metes out justice as he sees it without regard to the law. To punish a woman accused of beating and otherwise abusing her old mother-in-law, Shangang has her bound and exhibited in the village in humiliating fashion, after which the woman hangs herself in front of his door. Her husband threatens to report Shangang to higher authorities, and eventually prosecutors Su Qiang and Xiao Ding come to investigate after being tipped off by an anonymous letter. They find that they have to take Shangang away for his illegal treatment of the woman, and when the villagers complain, Shangang himself tells them to uncomplainingly accept the law.

References

External links
 

1994 films
1994 drama films
Golden Rooster Best Film recipients
Chinese drama films
1990s Mandarin-language films